Isenhour is a surname derived from the German word , meaning "iron hewer". The name shares its origin with the more popular Eisenhower.

Isenhour may refer to:


People
Mary Isenhour, American political strategist
Tripp Isenhour, American golfer

Places

United States
J. W. Isenhour Tennis Center, North Carolina
Daniel Isenhour House and Farm, a U.S. historic building in North Carolina

See also
Eisenhauer
W. Stine Isenhower (1927-2023), American politician

References

Americanized surnames
Swiss-language surnames
German-language surnames
Occupational surnames